Legacy is an album by the jazz pianist Ramsey Lewis, released in 1978 on Columbia Records. The album reached No. 10 on the Billboard Jazz Albums chart.

Overview
Legacy was produced by James L. Mack and Ramsey Lewis.

Critical reception
The Pittsburgh Press wrote that Legacy "is a serious piece made up of toccata, adagio and fugue," adding "while rather rigidly structured, there's plenty of improvisation, and Legacy both holds together and holds your interest."

Track listing

Credits
Arranged By – Byron Olson, James L. Mack
Bass – Ron Harris
Bass, Acoustic Bass – Bernard Reed
Drums – Keith Howard
Engineer – Stu Walder
Guitar – Byron Gregory
Keyboards – Ramsey Lewis
Percussion – Derf Reklaw
Producer – James L. Mack, Ramsey Lewis
Synthesizer – Terry Fryer

References

1978 albums
Ramsey Lewis albums
Columbia Records albums